Armando Linwood Bacot Jr.  (born March 6, 2000) is an American college basketball player for the North Carolina Tar Heels of the Atlantic Coast Conference (ACC).

High school career
Bacot attended Trinity Episcopal School for three years before transferring to IMG Academy for his senior year.

Recruiting
Bacot was considered a five-star recruit by ESPN and Rivals, and a four-star recruit by 247Sports. On August 16, 2018, Bacot committed to playing college basketball for North Carolina over offers from Duke, Kansas, Oklahoma State, Villanova, and VCU.

College career

Freshman season (2019–20)

On November 20, 2019, Bacot had 22 points and 14 rebounds in a 75–61 win over Elon. He had 23 points, 12 rebounds and a season-high six blocks in a 78–74 win over Oregon on November 29. In a 74–49 loss to Ohio State on December 4, Bacot suffered a left ankle injury and was expected to miss some time. However, he returned for the following game, a 56–47 loss to Virginia, and scored 11 points. He sat out North Carolina's home victory against Wake Forest on March 3, 2020. As a freshman, Bacot averaged 9.6 points and 8.3 rebounds per game, shooting 46.9 percent from the floor. Armando also had 11 double-doubles, the second most by a Tar Heel freshman.

Sophomore season (2020–21)
As a sophomore, he averaged 12.3 points and 7.8 rebounds per game, shooting 62.8 percent from the floor. He was named to the Third Team All-Atlantic Coast Conference (ACC). On April 6, 2021, he declared for the 2021 NBA draft while maintaining his college eligibility. He withdrew his name from the draft pool in order to return to Chapel Hill for his junior season.

Junior season (2021–22) 
On November 5, 2021, new UNC head coach Hubert Davis named Bacot as team captain alongside sophomores R. J. Davis and Caleb Love. On January 8, 2022, Bacot posted career-highs of 29 points and 21 rebounds in a 78–54 win against Virginia. Bacot picked up 23 double-doubles in the regular season, tying the UNC single-season record previously held by Brice Johnson. Bacot was a key performer in the Tar Heels' 94–81 upset over Duke in Mike Krzyzewski's final game in Cameron Indoor Stadium, scoring 23 points along with 7 rebounds. Four out of the five Tar Heel starters scored twenty-plus points in the game. Following the conclusion of the regular season, he was named First Team All-ACC, and finished runner-up the voting for ACC Player of the Year, behind Wake Forest's Alondes Williams. On March 10, 2022, Bacot recorded his 24th double-double of the season, breaking the school record of 23 that had been set by Brice Johnson in 2016. On March 27, 2022, Bacot tied Tim Duncan's ACC single-season record with his 29th double-double and also passed Duncan (457) for the most rebounds in a single season in ACC history (since 1985–86). Entering the 2022 Final Four, Bacot has 475 rebounds in the 2021–22 season, which is 4th in NCAA history for a single-season (since 1985–86). North Carolina lost in the national championship game to Kansas. Bacot recorded 15 points and 15 rebounds, becoming the first to have a double-double in all six tournament games.

Senior season (2022–23)
Following the Tar Heels' stunning Final Four run in 2022, Bacot decided to return to Chapel Hill for his senior year. Along with Love, Davis, and Black, Bacot was part of a core for a team that earned the preseason No. 1 ranking. in the AP Poll. Despite the expectations, the team struggled throughout the season, going 23–10 and missing out on the NCAA tournament. Bacot, however, was one of the lone bright spots for the Tar Heels, earning first-team all-ACC honors and being named third team All-America. On January 21, 2023, in an 80–69 win against rivals NC State, Bacot surpassed two Tar Heel records. He passed Tyler Hansbrough for most rebounds in a career at UNC, and Billy Cunningham for most double doubles in program history. On the season, he averaged 15.9 points, 10.4 rebounds, and 1.4 assists per game.

National team career
Bacot played for the United States under-18 basketball team at the 2018 FIBA Under-18 Americas Championship. He averaged 7.8 points and five rebounds, helping his team win the gold medal.

Career statistics

College

|-
| style="text-align:left;"| 2019–20
| style="text-align:left;"| North Carolina
| 32 || 32 || 24.5 || .469 || – || .645 || 8.3 || 1.2 || .5 || 1.1 || 9.6
|-
| style="text-align:left;"| 2020–21
| style="text-align:left;"| North Carolina
| 29 || 28 || 22.7 || .628 || .000 || .661 || 7.8 || .8 || .7 || .9 || 12.3
|-
| style="text-align:left;"| 2021–22
| style="text-align:left;"| North Carolina
| 39 || 39 || 31.6 || .569 || .125 || .670 || 13.1 || 1.5 || .8 || 1.7 || 16.3
|-
| style="text-align:left;"| 2022–23
| style="text-align:left;"| North Carolina
| 32 || 32 || 30.3 || .554 || .000 || .665 || 10.4 || 1.4 || .6 || 1.0 || 15.9
|- class="sortbottom"
| style="text-align:center;" colspan="2"| Career
| 132 || 131 || 30.3 || .556 || .067 || .663 || 10.1 || 1.3 || .7 || 1.8 || 13.7

Acting
In 2023, Bacot made a cameo in a season three episode of Netflix's Outer Banks.

References

External links
North Carolina Tar Heels bio
USA Basketball bio

2000 births
Living people
All-American college men's basketball players
American men's basketball players
Basketball players from Richmond, Virginia
Centers (basketball)
IMG Academy alumni
McDonald's High School All-Americans
North Carolina Tar Heels men's basketball players
Power forwards (basketball)